Starozhivotinnoye is a rural locality (a selo) in Aydarovskoye Rural Settlement, Ramonsky District, Voronezh Oblast, Russia. The population was 179 as of 2010. There are 103 streets.

Geography 
Starozhivotinnoye is located 8 km southwest of Ramon (the district's administrative centre) by road. Aydarovo is the nearest rural locality.

References 

Rural localities in Ramonsky District